R&B from the Marquee is an album by Alexis Korner's Blues Incorporated released in November 1962 on Decca Records. Blues Incorporated was a British rhythm and blues band in the early 1960s.  Although never very successful commercially, it was extremely influential on the development of British rock music in the 1960s and later.

Track listing

Re-releases
The album was re-released by Decca on CD (UDCD 657) with a bonus track "I'm Built For Comfort" (Willie Dixon) Vocal: John Baldry.
Limited re-issued CD in Japan in 2007 (24 January 2007) Strange Days Records (POCE-1087)

Personnel
Alexis Korner - acoustic guitar
Cyril Davies - vocals (3,5,6,7,9), harmonica (except for 6)
Dick Heckstall-Smith - tenor saxophone (except for 3), vocal chorus (7)
Keith Scott - piano
Spike Heatley - string bass (except for 7)
Graham Burbidge - drums
Long John Baldry - vocals (2,11,12), vocal chorus (7)
Teddy Wadmore - bass guitar (7)
Big Jim Sullivan - vocal chorus (7)
Recording Engineer: Jack Clegg
Produced by Jack Good
Recorded: Decca West Hampstead Studios, London, 8 June 1962
Released in November 1962 (Decca Ace of Clubs LP, ACL 1130)

References

External links
Alexis Korner
Alexis Korner's Blues Incorporated R&B From The Marquee
Cyril Davis

1962 albums
Decca Records albums
Blues Incorporated albums